Humayun Khan Panni (died:11 May 2006) was a Bangladeshi politician and the former deputy Speaker of Parliament.

Early life and family
Humayun Khan Panni was born in the early 1920s, to the Bengali Muslim family known as the Zamindars of Karatia. His ancestors were Pashtuns belonging to the Panni tribe, and had migrated from Afghanistan to Bengal in the 16th century where they became culturally assimilated.

Career
During the 1991 Bangladeshi general election, Panni successfully won a seat at the Tangail-8 constituency as a Bangladesh Nationalist Party candidate. He served for a second term after the February 1996 Bangladeshi general election.

Death
Panni died on 11 May 2006 at the Apollo Hospital Dhaka in Bangladesh.

References

Bangladesh Nationalist Party politicians
Deputy Speakers of the Jatiya Sangsad
2006 deaths
5th Jatiya Sangsad members
6th Jatiya Sangsad members
Karatia Zamindari family
20th-century Bengalis
1920 births